Michael Lockett Garrett (born April 12, 1944) is a former American football player who won the Heisman Trophy in 1965 as a halfback for the USC Trojans. Garrett played professional football for eight seasons with the Kansas City Chiefs and San Diego Chargers. From 1993 until 2010 he was the athletic director at the University of Southern California (USC). Garrett became the athletic director at California State University, Los Angeles (Cal State LA) in 2015.

Early life
Garrett graduated from Roosevelt High School in Los Angeles, California.  He was a resident of Maravilla housing projects.

College career
A two time All-American, Garrett set numerous NCAA, Pac-8 Conference and USC records in his career by amassing a then unheard of 3,221 yards and scored 30 touchdowns. Garrett also led the nation in rushing in 1965 with 267 carries for 1,440 yards. He also caught 36 passes, returned 43 punts, returned 30 kickoffs and threw 6 passes. Two of his passes went for touchdowns.  Garrett was awarded the 1965 W. J. Voit Memorial Trophy as the outstanding football player on the Pacific Coast. He won the Heisman Trophy after the 1965 regular season. In 1985, he was voted into the College Football Hall of Fame.

Garrett signaled the dawn of the "Tailback U" era, where USC produced a stream of top tailbacks included Heisman winners O. J. Simpson (1968), Charles White (1979) and Marcus Allen (1981), as well as Heisman runners-up Anthony Davis (1974) and Ricky Bell (1976).

Garrett was a brother of the Alpha Kappa Chapter of the Alpha Phi Omega fraternity while a student at USC.  He is a member of The Pigskin Club of Washington, D.C. National Intercollegiate All-American Football Players Honor Roll.

Professional career
Garrett went on to play in the American Football League (AFL) with Kansas City Chiefs from 1966 to 1969 and in 1970 as the Chiefs moved to the National Football League in 1970.  He was traded to the San Diego Chargers and remained with them until 1973.

Garrett was a two-time AFL All-Star. in 1966 and 1967.  He played in the first  AFL–NFL World Championship Game, now referred to as Super Bowl I,  with the Chiefs after the 1966 season. He contributed 17 rushing yards, three receptions for 28 yards, and two kickoff returns for 43 yards in their loss.  Garrett won a World Championship ring with the Chiefs in Super Bowl IV, the last AFL–NFL World Championship Game before the AFL–NFL merger, when the AFL's Chiefs beat the NFL's Vikings, 23–7. Garrett was the top rusher of Super Bowl IV with 11 carries for 39 yards and a touchdown, also catching two passes for 25 yards and returning a kickoff for 18 yards. His touchdown came on head coach Hank Stram's iconic 65 Toss Power Trap play call. In his eight professional football seasons, Garrett rushed for 5,481 yards, caught 238 passes for 2,010 yards, returned 14 kickoffs for 323 yards, and returned 39 punts for 235 yards. Overall, Garrett gained a total of 8,049 yards and scored 49 touchdowns (35 rushing, 13 receiving, 1 punt return).

Garrett also was drafted three times by professional baseball teams. He was selected in the 41st round of the 1965 MLB Draft by the Pittsburgh Pirates and by the Los Angeles Dodgers twice, in the fourth round of the 1966 MLB Draft and the 35th round of the 1970 MLB Draft.

After professional football
After his professional football career, Mike Garrett earned a Juris Doctor from Western State University College of Law in 1986, but never took the bar exam.  He was the director of business development for the Great Western Forum, worked in the district attorney's office in San Diego and worked in various management positions.  He also did color commentary for USC football telecasts.

In January 1993, Garrett returned to USC to become its sixth athletic director. He came under fire when he hired the heavily criticized Pete Carroll as head football coach in 2001, but was vindicated when USC returned to status as a dominant football power. In 2005, he allowed safety Darnell Bing who was at USC at the time to wear his retired number 20 for his senior season.  In 2010, the USC football program was hit with severe NCAA sanctions, and USC self-imposed sanctions on its basketball program, in the wake of allegations about violations involving former USC stars Reggie Bush and O. J. Mayo.  These sanctions have been criticized by some NCAA football writers, including ESPN's Ted Miller, who wrote, "It's become an accepted fact among informed college football observers that the NCAA sanctions against USC were a travesty of justice, and the NCAA's refusal to revisit that travesty are a massive act of cowardice on the part of the organization."  On July 20, 2010, USC's incoming president, Max Nikias, announced major changes in the athletic department, including Garrett's replacement (effective August 3, 2010) by businessman and former USC quarterback Pat Haden.

In June 2013, Garrett became athletic director at the historically black college, Langston University, an NAIA school in Langston, Oklahoma. He resigned that position less than two years later. He is a board member for the Lott IMPACT Trophy, which is named after Ronnie Lott and is awarded annually to college football's Defensive IMPACT Player of the Year.

Garrett retired from the position of Executive Director of the Athletics Department at California State University, Los Angeles in 2016.

See also
 List of American Football League players
 List of college football yearly rushing leaders

References

External links
  Langston profile
 
 
 

1944 births
Living people
American football halfbacks
American football running backs
American Football League players
Kansas City Chiefs players
San Diego Chargers players
USC Trojans athletic directors
USC Trojans football players
Langston Lions athletic directors
All-American college football players
American Football League All-Star players
College Football Hall of Fame inductees
Heisman Trophy winners
Western State University College of Law alumni
Players of American football from Los Angeles
Sportspeople from Los Angeles